Joseph Aldège Albert "Baz" Bastien (August 29, 1919 – March 15, 1983) was a Canadian professional ice hockey goaltender, head coach and general manager. He played five games for the Toronto Maple Leafs of the National Hockey League in 1945, but received most of his playing accolades while with the Pittsburgh Hornets of the American Hockey League. He later became the Hornets' head coach and general manager and served in several front office positions with National Hockey League clubs until he was named the general manager of the Pittsburgh Penguins in 1976. He served in that capacity until his death in a car crash in 1983.

Playing career
Bastien began his playing career in 1939, playing for the Port Colborne Sailors of the Ontario Hockey Association Senior A League. He was sponsored by the Maple Leafs and in 1940 began playing for their team in the Senior A League: the Toronto Marlboros. The then 21-year-old goaltender led the Marlboros to the league championship in his first season with the club. He spent another year with the Marlboros before joining the Cornwall Flyers of the Quebec Senior Hockey League.

His playing career was temporarily interrupted by a two-year stint of military service with the Canadian Army. He returned to North America and playing hockey in 1945, beginning the season with the Maple Leafs. Unfortunately for him he was unable to secure a permanent spot on the Leafs' roster after Turk Broda returned from his own military service.

Bastien was sent by the Maple Leafs to the Pittsburgh Hornets, their top professional affiliate. He spent the majority of four seasons with the Hornets. He was named to the league's First All-Star team in 1947, 1948 and 1949 and also won the Hap Holmes Memorial Award for fewest goals against in 1948 and 1949.

Personal tragedy befell Bastien on September 30, 1949, at Maple Leafs training camp in Welland, Ontario. On the third or fourth shot he faced that day the puck struck his right eye. The damage to his eye was severe to the extent that it needed to be removed. Bastien's playing career was over, and he would wear a glass eye for the rest of his life.

Front office
"Baz" remained with the Hornets in an administrative capacity and was named their new head coach during the 1949–50 season. The following season, he was named general manager, lasting one season before being replaced. He returned to the Hornets as head coach in 1953, again for a single season. When the Hornets returned to Pittsburgh after a five-season absence due to the destruction of Duquesne Gardens and construction of the Pittsburgh Civic Arena Bastien returned with them, again as head coach. He moved to the general manager's position again in 1962, and remained in that capacity until the Hornets folded in 1967. He returned behind the bench in 1966, coaching them to a Calder Cup win, their third, in their final season.

He joined the Detroit Red Wings as assistant general manager to former Hornet Sid Abel, and followed Abel to the Kansas City Scouts, in the same capacity, in 1974.

Bastien returned to Pittsburgh in 1976, replacing Wren Blair as general manager of the Pittsburgh Penguins. His first trade for the Penguins took place on September 20, 1977. In that trade he acquired Brian Spencer from the Buffalo Sabres in exchange for Ron Schock. On several occasions he traded some of the Penguins' stars in order to maintain the team's payroll. In November 1977, Bastien traded All-Star MVP Syl Apps, Jr. to the Los Angeles Kings in exchange for Dave Schultz. Later in that month he sent superstar Pierre Larouche to the Montreal Canadiens for Pete Mahovlich and Peter Lee. Bastien also faced criticism for trading Pittsburgh's first round draft pick, on three occasions, in 1977, 1978 and 1979.

Death
Bastien attended a dinner by the Professional Hockey Writer's Association (PHWA) on March 14, 1983.  Later that night while driving home, he collided with a motorcycle on Interstate 376 in suburban Green Tree, Pennsylvania at 12:15 AM, March 15, 1983.  He was pronounced dead at Mercy Hospital due to having fractured his skull in the collision and having had a heart attack afterward. He was 63. Penguins coach Eddie Johnston was named his replacement on May 27, 1983.

Two awards were created the following season to honor Bastien. The American Hockey League began awarding the Aldege "Baz" Bastien Memorial Award annually to the best goaltender in the league, and the Pittsburgh chapter of the PHWA awarded the Aldege "Baz" Bastien Memorial Good Guy Award to the Penguin judged to be most cooperative with the media.

Career statistics

Regular season and playoffs

References

External links
 

1919 births
1983 deaths
Atlantic City Seagulls players
Canadian expatriates in the United States
Canadian ice hockey goaltenders
Canadian ice hockey coaches
Cornwall Flyers players
Ice hockey people from Ontario
Kansas City Scouts
Ontario Hockey Association Senior A League (1890–1979) players
Pittsburgh Hornets coaches
Pittsburgh Hornets players
Pittsburgh Penguins executives
Road incident deaths in Pennsylvania
Sportspeople from Timmins
Toronto Maple Leafs players
Toronto Marlboros players